This is a list of tallest buildings in Karachi. Karachi has around 36 buildings rising at least 100 metres (330 ft) in height.

Completed

Under construction / Proposed & Vision

Images

See also
 List of tallest buildings in Pakistan
 List of tallest buildings in the world
 List of tallest buildings and structures in South Asia

References

01
Tallest buildings
Tallest, Karachi
Architecture in Karachi